James Edward Van Zandt (December 18, 1898 – January 6, 1986) was an American Republican Party politician who represented Altoona, Pennsylvania in the U.S. House of Representatives for eleven terms from 1939 to 1963.

Biography
James Van Zandt was born in Altoona, Pennsylvania; his maternal grandparents were Irish immigrants. In 1917 he enlisted as an apprentice seaman in the United States Navy and served two years. He was a member of the United States Naval Reserve from 1919 to 1943, rising to the rank of lieutenant. In December 1933 he toured the country with Smedley Butler to recruit members for the Veterans of Foreign Wars (VFW).  He was the national commander of the Veterans of Foreign Wars from 1934 to 1936. He later corroborated Butler's testimony regarding the Business Plot, stating that 'agents of Wall Street' had also attempted to recruit him for a planned coup to overthrow Franklin Delano Roosevelt, shortly after Butler warned him against them.

He was elected in 1938 as a Republican to the 76th, 77th, and 78th United States Congresses, and served from January 3, 1939, until his resignation September 24, 1943, when he re-entered the service. While a Member of Congress he was called to active duty in September 1941 and served until January 1942 with the Pacific Fleet and in escort convoy duty in the North Atlantic. He reentered the service in September 1943 as a lieutenant commander and was assigned to the Pacific area until discharged as a captain in 1946, and retired as rear admiral in United States Naval Reserve in 1959.

He was elected to the 80th and to the seven succeeding Congresses. Van Zandt, while a member of the House Armed Services Committee, made an impassioned speech on the House floor leveling charges against Secretary of Defense Louis A. Johnson and Air Force Secretary Stuart Symington in regard to the procurement of the B-36 bomber. This speech brought into public view the "Revolt of the Admirals". The basis of these charges was a bogus document from Cedric Worth who was the special assistant to the Under Secretary of the Navy Dan Kimball. On June 9, 1948, the HASC voted to investigate the charges.

In the 1954 attack on the House of Representatives by Puerto Rican nationalists, he tackled and disarmed one of the shooters. Van Zandt voted in favor of the Civil Rights Acts of 1957 and 1960, as well as the 24th Amendment to the U.S. Constitution. In 1962, he unsuccessfully challenged United States Senator Joe Clark, who won re-election to a second term by a 51 to 49 percent margin. He was a Special Representative of the Governor of Pennsylvania until 1971. He is buried at Arlington National Cemetery.

See also

Business Plot

References

Sources
 Retrieved on 2008-02-07
The Political Graveyard

External links

1898 births
1986 deaths
20th-century American naval officers
20th-century American politicians
United States Navy personnel of World War I
United States Navy personnel of World War II
American people of Irish descent
Burials at Arlington National Cemetery
Military personnel from Pennsylvania
Politicians from Altoona, Pennsylvania
Republican Party members of the United States House of Representatives from Pennsylvania
United States Navy admirals
United States Navy reservists
National Commanders of the Veterans of Foreign Wars